This is a list of the reptile species recorded in Ghana. There are 154 reptile species in Ghana, of which one is critically endangered, one is endangered, two are vulnerable and two are near threatened. This list is derived from the Reptile Database which lists species of reptile and includes those reptiles that have recently been classified as extinct (since 1500 AD). The taxonomy and naming of the individual species is based on those currently used by the Reptile Database as of 20 September 2011 and supplemented by the common names and taxonomy from the IUCN where no Reptile Database article was available.

The following tags are used to highlight specific species' conservation status as assessed by the IUCN:

Order: Testudines (turtles)

Family: Testudinidae (tortoises)
Genus: Kinixys
 Bell's hinge-back tortoise, Kinixys belliana
 Eroded hinge-back tortoise, Kinixys erosa
 Home's hinge-back tortoise, Kinixys homeana VU
Family: Cheloniidae (sea turtles) 
Genus: Chelonia
 Green turtle, Chelonia mydas
Genus: Eretmochelys
 Hawksbill, Eretmochelys imbricata
Genus: Lepidochelys
 Olive ridley, Lepidochelys Olivacea
Family: Dermochelyidae 
Genus: Dermochelys
 Leatherback sea turtle, Dermochelys coriacea CR
Family: Pelomedusidae (Afro-American side-neck turtles)
Genus: Pelomedusidae
 Helmeted turtle, Pelomedusa subrufa
Genus: Pelusios
 Ivory Coast mud turtle, Pelusios cupulatta
 African forest turtle, Pelusios gabonensis
 West African black turtle, Pelusios niger
Family: Trionychidae (soft-shell turtles)
Genus: Cyclanorbis
 Nubian soft-shelled turtle, Cyclanorbis elegans NT
 Senegal soft-shelled turtle, Cyclanorbis senegalensis NT

Order: Squamata (snakes and lizards)

Family: Agamidae (agamas)
Genus: Agama
 Agama africana
 Common agama, Agama agama
 Doria's agama, Agama doriae
 False agama, Agama paragama
 Senegal agama, Agama sankaranica
 Agama sylvana
Family: Chamaeleonidae (chameleons)
Genus: Chamaeleo
 Graceful chameleon, Chamaeleo gracilis
 Senegal chameleon, Chamaeleo senegalensis
Genus: Trioceros
 Crested chameleon, Trioceros cristatus
Family: Gekkonidae (geckos)
Genus: Hemidactylus
 Brook's house gecko, Hemidactylus angulatus
 Nigerian leaf-toed gecko, Hemidactylus ansorgii
 Spotted house gecko, Hemidactylus brookii
 Banded leaf-toed gecko, Hemidactylus fasciatus
 House gecko, Hemidactylus mabouia
 Guinea leaf-toed gecko, Hemidactylus muriceus
Genus: Lygodactylus
 Cameroon dwarf gecko, Lygodactylus conraui
 Chevron-throated dwarf gecko, Lygodactylus gutturalis
 Painted dwarf gecko, Lygodactylus picturatus
Family: Eublepharidae (eyelid geckos)
Genus: Hemitheconyx
 Fat-tail gecko, Hemitheconyx caudicinctus
Family: Phyllodactylidae (leaf-toed geckos)
Genus: Ptyodactylus
 Yellow fan-fingered gecko, Ptyodactylus hasselquistii
 Ragazzi's fan-footed gecko, Ptyodactylus ragazzii
Family: Gerrhosauridae (plated lizards)
Genus: Gerrhosaurus
 Rough-scaled plated lizard, Gerrhosaurus major
Family: Lacertidae (true lizards)
Genus: Acanthodactylus
 Chabanaud's fringe-fingered lizard, Acanthodactylus boueti
 Guinea fringe-fingered lizard, Acanthodactylus guineensis
Genus: Gastropholis
 Cope's spinytail lizard, Gastropholis echinata
Genus: Holaspis
 Saw-tail lizard, Holaspis guentheri
Family: Scincidae (skinks)
Genus: Chalcides
 Thierry's cylindrical skink, Chalcides thierryi
Genus: Cophoscincopus
 Keeled water skink, Cophoscincopus durus
 Cophoscincopus greeri
 Cophoscincopus simulans
Genus: Lepidothyris
 Fire skink, Lepidothyris fernandi
Genus: Lygosoma
 Lygosoma guineensis
Genus: Mochlus
 Mochlus brevicaudus
Genus: Panaspis
 Togo lidless skink, Panaspis togoensis
Genus: Trachylepis
 Senegal skink, Trachylepis affinis
 Guinea skink, Trachylepis albilabris
 Trachylepis buettneri
 Speckle-lipped skink, Trachylepis maculilabris
 Teita skink, Trachylepis perrotetii
 Tropical skink, Trachylepis polytropis
 African five-lined skink, Trachylepis quinquetaeniata
 Rodenburg's skink Trachylepis rodenburgi
Family: Varanidae (monitors)
Genus: Varanus
 Savanna monitor, Varanus exanthematicus
 Nile monitor, Varanus niloticus
Family: Amphisbaenidae (worm lizards)
Genus: cynisca
 Ghana worm lizard, sCynisca kraussi EN
 Coast worm lizard, Cynisca leucura
 Cynisca muelleri
 Cynisca williamsi
Family: Pythonidae (pythons)
Genus: Python
 Ball python, Python regius 
 African rock python, Python sebae
Family: Boidae (boas)
Genus: Calabaria
 Calabar ground python, Calabaria reinhardtii
Genus: Eryx
 Muller's sand boa, Eryx muelleri 
Family: Colubridae (colubrid snakes)
Genus: Afronatrix
 African brown water snake, Afronatrix anoscopus
Genus: Bamanophis
 Bamanophis dorri
Genus: Crotaphopeltis
 Crotaphopeltis hippocrepis
 White-lipped herald snake, Crotaphopeltis hotamboeia
Genus: Dasypeltis
 Central African egg-eater, Dasypeltis fasciata
 Common egg-eater, Dasypeltis scabra
Genus: Dipsadoboa
 Dipsadoboa duchesnii
 Gunther's green tree snake, Dipsadoboa unicolor
Genus: Grayia
 Smith's African water snake, Grayia smithii
Genus: Hapsidophrys
 Black-lined green snake, Hapsidophrys lineatus
 Emerald snake, Hapsidophrys smaragdina
Genus: Meizodon
 Western crowned smooth snake, Meizodon coronatus
Genus: Natriciteres
 Collared marsh snake, Natriciteres fuliginoides
 Olive marsh snake, Natriciteres olivacea
 Variable marsh snake, Natriciteres variegata
Genus: Philothamnus
 Emerald green snake, Philothamnus heterodermus
 Slender green snake, Philothamnus heterolepidotus
 Northern green bush snake, Philothamnus irregularis
 Spotted bush snake, Philothamnus semivariegatus
Genus: Rhamnophis
 Large-eyed green tree snake, Rhamnophis aethiopissa
Genus: Scaphiophis
 African shovel-nosed snake, Scaphiophis albopunctatus
Genus: Telescopus
 Variable cat snake, Telescopus variegatus
Genus: Thelotornis
 Forest vine snake Thelotornis kirtlandii
Genus: Thrasops
 Yellow-throated bold-eyed tree snake, Thrasops flavigularis
 Western black tree snake, Thrasops occidentalis
Genus: Toxicodryas
 Blanding's tree snake, Toxicodryas blandingii
 Fischer's cat snake, Toxicodryas pulverulenta
Family: Lamprophiidae
Genus: Amblyodipsas
 Western purple-glossed snake, Amblyodipsas unicolor
Genus: Aparallactus
 Lined centipede-eater, Aparallactus lineatus
 Reticulated centipede-eater, Aparallactus lunulatus
 Western forest centipede-eater, Aparallactus modestus
Genus: Atractaspis
 Slender burrowing asp, Atractaspis aterrima
 Fat burrowing asp, Atractaspis corpulenta
 Dahomey burrowing asp, Atractaspis dahomeyensis
 Variable burrowing asp, Atractaspis irregularis
Genus: Boaedon
 Striped house snake, Boaedon lineatus
 Olive house snake, Boaedon olivaceus
 Hallowell's house snake, Boaedon virgatus
Genus: Bothrophthalmus
 Red-black striped snake, Bothrophthalmus lineatus
Genus: Chamaelycus
 African banded snake, Chamaelycus fasciatus
Genus: Gonionotophis
 Savanna lesser file snake, Gonionotophis grantii
 Mocquard's file snake, Gonionotophis guirali
 Matschie's file snake, Gonionotophis klingi
 Western forest file snake, Gonionotophis poensis
 Small-eyed file snake, Gonionotophis steophthalmus
Genus: Hormonotus
 Uganda house snake, Hormonotus modestus
Genus: Lycophidion
 Leach's wolf snake, Lycophidion irroratum
 Flat wolf snake, Lycophidion laterale
 Lycophidion nigromaculatum
 Lycophidion semicinctum
Genus: Malpolon
 Moila snake, Malpolon moilensis
Genus: Polemon
 Reinhardt's snake-eater, Polemon acanthias
 Ivory Coast snake-eater, Polemon neuwiedi
Genus: Prosymna
 Prosymna greigerti
 Ghana shovel-snout, Prosymna meleagris
Genus: Psammophis
 Elegant sand racer, Psammophis elegans
 Lined olympic snake, Psammophis lineatus
 Olive grass racer, Psammophis phillipsi
 Ornate olympic snake, Psammophis praeornatus
 Rukwa sand racer, Psammophis rukwae
Genus: Psammophylax
 Striped beaked snake, Psammophylax acutusḹ
Genus: Rhamphiophis
 Western beaked snake, Rhamphiophis oxyrhynchus
Family: Elapidae
Genus: Dendroaspis
 Jameson's mamba, Dendroaspis jamesoni
 Western green mamba, Dendroaspis viridis
Genus: Elapsoidea
 Angolan garter snake, Elapsoidea semiannulata
Genus: Naja
 Mali cobra, Naja katiensis
 Forest cobra, Naja melanoleuca
 Black-necked spitting cobra, Naja nigricollis
 Senegalese cobra, Naja senegalensis
Genus: Pseudohaje
 African tree cobra, Pseudohaje goldii
 Hoodless cobra Pseudohaje nigra
Family: Viperidae (adders and vipers)
Genus: Atheris
 Western bush viper, Atheris chlorechis
 African bush viper, Atheris squamigera
Genus: Bitis
 Puff adder, Bitis arietans
 Gaboon adder, Bitis gabonica
 Rhinoceros viper, Bitis nasicornis
Genus: Causus
 Forest night adder, Causus lichtensteinii
 Spotted night adder, Causus maculatus
 Common night adder, Causus rhombeatus
Genus: Echis
 African saw-scaled viper, Echis ocellatus
Family: Typhlopidae (blind snakes)
Genus: Afrotyphlops
 Common lined worm snake, Afrotyphlops lineolatus
 Spotted blind snake, Afrotyphlops punctatus
Genus: Guinea
 Two-coloured blind snake, Guinea bicolor
 Sundevall's worm snake, Guinea sundewalli
Genus: Leptotyphlops
 West African blind snake, Leptotyphlops debilis
Genus: Letheobia
 Gabon beaked snake, Letheobia caeca
Genus: Myriopholis
 Long-nosed worm snake, Myriopholis macrorhyncha
Genus: Typhlops
 Typhlops caecatus

Order: Crocodylidae (crocodiles and relatives)

Family: Crocodylus (crocodiles)
Genus: Crocodylus
 West African crocodile, Crocodylus suchus
Genus: Mecistops
 West African slender-snouted crocodile, Mecistops cataphractus CR
Genus: Osteolaemus
 West African dwarf crocodile, Osteolaemus tetraspis VU

See also
List of chordate orders
List of regional reptiles lists

References

Ghana
reptiles

'
Ghana